Dinah Sykes (born April 10, 1977) is an American politician who has served in the Kansas Senate from the 21st district since 2017. Since 2021, Sykes has served as the Minority Leader of the Kansas Senate.

Career
Sykes earned a bachelor's degree in business administration from Trevecca Nazarene University. She was a stay-at-home mom and personal chef before entering politics. Sykes also served as a PTA president before being elected to the Kansas Senate.

Sykes was first elected to the Kansas Senate as a Republican in November 2016. In December 2018, Sykes switched to the Democratic Party along with three other female Kansas legislators—Senator Barbara Bollier, Representative Joy Koesten, and Representative Stephanie Clayton.

In December 2020, Sykes was elected by the Senate Democratic Caucus to be Minority Leader of the Kansas Senate.

References

External links
Vote Smart Dinah Sykes

1977 births
21st-century American politicians
21st-century American women politicians
Kansas Democrats
Kansas Republicans
Kansas state senators
Living people
Trevecca Nazarene University alumni
Women state legislators in Kansas